Morty or Mortie is a masculine given name which may refer to:

People 
 Morty Buckles (born 1971 or 1972), African-American former race car driver
 Mortimer Morty Corb (1917–1996), American jazz double-bassist
 Mortimer Mortie Dutra (1899-1988), American golfer
 Morty Gunty (1929-1984), American actor and comedian
 Morty Black, stage name of bassist Morten Skaget (born 1960)

Fictional characters 
 Morty Fieldmouse, nephew of Disney character Mickey Mouse
 Morty Flickman, on Desperate Housewives, portrayed by Bob Newhart
 Morty Fine, father of the main character on the sitcom TV series The Nanny (1993-1999)
 Morty Manta, the English anime name of Manta Oyamada, a Shaman King character
 the title character of the American comic strip Morty Meekle (1956-1966)
 Morty Seinfeld, father of Jerry Seinfeld in the series Seinfeld
 Morty Smith, one of the title characters on the American animated series Rick and Morty
 Morty (Pokémon), from the Pokémon universe
 Morty, father of Jacob in the Canadian animated series Jacob Two-Two
 Morty, the Angel of Death in the 2006 movie Click
 Morty Fyde, a character from Captain Underpants
 Morty, a character in the series Tales from the crypt.

See also 
 
 Louise De Mortie (1833–1867), African-American lecturer and fundraiser on behalf of American Civil War orphans
 Mortimer (disambiguation)
 Morten
 Mort (disambiguation)

English masculine given names
Masculine given names
Hypocorisms